Third conjugation may refer to:

 Latin conjugation#Third conjugation
 Bulgarian conjugation#Third conjugation
 French conjugation#Third group
 Portuguese verb conjugation#Third conjugation (partir)